Aday Mara Gomez (born April 7, 2005) is a Spanish professional basketball player for Casademont Zaragoza of the Liga ACB.

Professional career
Mara began his basketball career with the under-18 team for Casademont Zaragoza. He played in the 2020–21 Euroleague Basketball Next Generation Tournament and averaged 8.5 points, 10.5 rebounds, and 3.5 blocks over four games.

Mara was loaned to CB Peñas Huesca of LEB Oro at the start of the 2021–2022 season due to a roster shortage at the club. He averaged 2.7 points, 3.8 rebounds, and 0.7 blocks over six games. Mara was then assigned to Anagan Olivar of Liga EBA, the Spanish fourth division, where he averaged 10.8 points, 7.2 rebounds, 1.4 assists, and 1.8 blocks per game.

Mara made his Liga ACB debut with Zaragoza on October 16, 2022.

Mara took part in the Basketball Without Borders camp during the 2023 NBA All-Star weekend in Salt Lake City, Utah.

National team career
Mara played for the Spain under-17 basketball team at the 2022 FIBA Under-17 Basketball World Cup. He averaged 12.6 points, five rebounds, and 1.9 blocks per game as Spain made the final before losing to the United States.

Personal life
Mara was born and lives in Zaragoza, Spain. His father, Francisco Javier Mara, played basketball professionally for CB Zaragoza from 1986 to 1988. His mother Angeli Gomez, played volleyball on the Spain women's national volleyball team.

References

External links
FIBA profile
RealGM profile

Living people
2005 births
Basket Zaragoza players
Spanish men's basketball players
CB Peñas Huesca players